Ford City Mall is a shopping center located on the Southwest Side of Chicago in the West Lawn neighborhood at 76th Street and Cicero Avenue.
 Opened in 1965, Ford City is the largest enclosed mall in Chicago outside of downtown. Anchored by JCPenney, the mall contains more than 135 stores and restaurants including Applebee’s, Bath & Body Works, The Children’s Place, Foot Locker, Zales Jewelers, Marshalls, Old Navy, Victoria’s Secret/PINK, and Ross Dress for Less. There are several out parcels including a 14-theater AMC Theatres. Ford City Mall is managed by Mid-America Asset Managements.

History
Construction started in 1942 to build a defense plant. Approximately 17,000 workers were employed. This caused the southwest side of the city to become more populated as more people were moving there for work. By October, Building No. 1 was finished. Testing of aircraft engines to be used for the B-29 bomber began. By the spring of 1943, 10 buildings, made of steel, concrete and wood, had been constructed. The largest building was Building No. 4. It covered , and it was built out of reinforced concrete.

By December 1945, the plant was left vacant due to the end of World War II. The government attempted to sell it without success. It was later retrofitted for automobile production for Tucker Corporation and then Ford Motor Company.

The building remained a white elephant until the Korean War, when it was reopened to build airplane engines for the war effort, under contract from Ford Motor Company. The Ford company modernized everything inside the building, employing nearly 12,000 people. The building closed again in 1959.

In 1961, the government sold it to Harry F Chaddick, who along with other investors planned to develop a shopping center. Some buildings were torn down to make room for parking lots. The buildings that remained were remodeled to attract retail tenants.

Developers divided the building into a separate portion for the mall. The mall opened in 1965 as Ford City. 
The mall consists of two halves - a strip mall and enclosed mall. The strip mall portion is connected to the enclosed mall by a tunnel called "The Connection". It utilizes the basement between the severed halves of the buildings directly below the parking lot. The Connection was originally called Peacock Alley from the late 1970s through the 1980s. Wieboldt's occupied the western-facing space until 1987 when Carson Pirie Scott moved in. The southern-facing space was last occupied by Montgomery Ward until that chain's bankruptcy. That space has since been demolished. JCPenney occupies the eastern facing space. Turn Style had anchored the east end of the strip mall portion until the store was sold and converted to Venture and then to Sears until they closed the store in August 2010.

Until February 2008, the mall was managed by General Growth Properties Inc. for a private investment company.

In 2009-2010, Ford City Mall began a multimillion-dollar long term capital redevelopment program undertaking North Mall infrastructure work, Cicero Avenue frontage and North Mall parking lot resurfacing.  During this time new tenants such as Conway (later Fallas), U.S. Cellular, Rodeo, Amici, Star Diamond Jewelers, GNC, She Bar, Eldorado Fine Jewelers, Avon, China Max, Sprint, and other stores opened for business at Ford City Mall. In early 2011, for the second phase of the long term capital redevelopment plan, the Cicero Avenue pylon signs were refurbished, giving tenants the ability to gain maximum store signage exposure along heavily trafficked Cicero Avenue.

As part of the 2011 capital redevelopment program, Ford City Mall is in the process of demolishing several small outparcel buildings and a former vacant anchor store, leading the way to future development options under discussion at this time.

In the summer of 2012, Ford City Mall closed part of The Connection and moved all retailers upstairs.

Ford City's renovation began in 2016. Plans include renovating inside the mall with corridor seating, new lighting and flooring and a newly remodeled food court. Both the Carson's and JCPenney were remodeled. A Five Below located in the North Mall portion opened in September 2016. In addition, there will be several outparcels to be constructed near the Southern end of the mall as well as a new CTA transit center to be opened in 2017. An outlot building that houses a Chipotle Mexican Grill and a Mattress Firm opened in 2017. An H&M store opened on August 9, 2018. 

On April 18, 2018, Carson's parent company The Bon-Ton Stores, announced that they will close all Carson's locations, including the Ford City location as a result of their bankruptcy. The store closed on August 29, 2018. The closure of Carson's left JCPenney as the remaining anchor.

Orange Line extension
The original plans for the Orange Line called for the terminus to be at Ford City, but due to lack of funding, the city decided to end the line at Midway Airport with a layout allowing for future expansion. In 2008, the Chicago Transit Authority undertook an Alternatives Analysis for the Orange Line extension to Ford City and determined that the cost of project stands at an estimated $200 million. On August 12, 2009, the CTA approved the extension plans, but they were later canceled.

Bus routes 
CTA

  54B South Cicero  
  67 67th/69th/71st  
  79 79th  

Pace

  379 Midway/Orland Park  
  383 South Cicero  
  384 Narragansett/Ridgeland  
  385 87th/111th/127th  
  390 Midway CTA/UPS Hodgkins

References

External links

1965 establishments in Illinois
Shopping malls in Chicago
Shopping malls established in 1965